Bethanie Mattek-Sands and Lucie Šafářová were the defending champions, but Šafářová did not participate due to illness. Mattek-Sands played alongside Andrea Sestini Hlaváčková, but lost in the quarterfinals to Alla Kudryavtseva and Katarina Srebotnik. 

Kudryavtseva and Srebotnik went on to win the title, defeating Andreja Klepač and María José Martínez Sánchez in the final, 6–3, 6–3.

Seeds

Draw

Draw

External links 
 Main draw

Volvo Car Open - Doubles
Charleston Open